
Gmina Łomża is a rural gmina (administrative district) in Łomża County, Podlaskie Voivodeship, in north-eastern Poland. Its seat is the town of Łomża, although the town is not part of the territory of the gmina.

The gmina contains part of the protected area called Łomża Landscape Park.

Villages
Gmina Łomża contains the villages and settlements of Andrzejki, Bacze Suche, Bacze-Lipnik, Boguszyce, Bożenica, Chojny Młode, Czaplice, Dłużniewo, Gać, Giełczyn, Grzymały Szczepankowskie, Janowo, Jarnuty, Jednaczewo, Kisiołki, Konarzyce, Koty, Łochtynowo, Lutostań, Mikołajew, Mikołajki, Milewo, Modzele-Skudosze, Modzele-Wypychy, Nowe Kupiski, Nowe Wyrzyki, Pniewo, Podgórze, Puchały, Rubinówka, Rybno, Siemień Nadrzeczny, Siemień-Rowy, Sierzputy Młode, Stara Łomża nad Rzeką, Stara Łomża przy Szosie, Stare Chojny, Stare Kupiski, Stare Modzele, Stare Sierzputy, Wygoda and Zawady.

Neighbouring gminas
Gmina Łomża is bordered by the city of Łomża and by the gminas of Mały Płock, Miastkowo, Nowogród, Piątnica, Rutki, Śniadowo, Wizna and Zambrów.

References

Polish official population figures 2006

Lomza
Łomża County